Bojan Žirović (born 26 January 1971) is a Serbian actor. He appeared in more than forty films since 1991.

Selected filmography

References

External links 

1971 births
Living people
People from Zrenjanin
Serbian male film actors
Miloš Žutić Award winners